Atomino is a 1990 puzzle video game originally for the Amiga, Atari ST and MS-DOS. A version was made for the Commodore 64 in 1991. The objective is to build molecules from atoms, with gradually increasing difficulty and speed.

Rules 
The player is given a grid on which to place atoms, which are supplied at random into a stack. An atom needs a specific number of "bonds", from 1 to 4, which are made by placing atoms next to each other. When all connected atoms have exactly the correct number of bonds, a molecule is completed, and it is removed from the board.

Atoms can be placed on an empty space, or swapped with an existing atom, which will enter the stack. For instance, even if you place an atom needing 4 bonds on the edge, where it has only 3 neighbors, it can be overwritten with an atom needing fewer bonds.

In each level, an objective is given, like "Build 2 molecules" or "Build 4 molecules with at least 9 atoms". In addition to completing the objective, the player must remove all atoms from the board before the next level starts.

External links

1990 video games
Amiga games
Atari ST games
Commodore 64 games
DOS games
Puzzle video games
Video games developed in Germany
Video games scored by Jochen Hippel
Blue Byte games
Psygnosis games
Single-player video games